"It's OK!" is a song by British girl group Atomic Kitten for their second studio album, Feels So Good (2002). It was written by Norwegian musicians Hallgeir Rustan, Mikkel Storleer Eriksen and Tor Erik Hermansen and one out of several songs they produced for the trio under their production moniker Stargate. "It's OK!" features an instrumentation consisting essentially of acoustic guitars, soft drums, and synthesized strings. Lyrically, it has the protagonist reminiscing about an emotionally unfruitful relationship with a former loved one from which she has since moved on for the better.

Virgin Records released the song as the lead single from Feels So Good on 20 May 2002. Another commercial success for Atomic Kitten, it became the band's sixth top ten hit on the UK Singles Chart, peaking at number three, and reached the top ten in several European nations, including Austria, Denmark, Ireland, Scotland, and Switzerland. An accompanying music video for "It's OK!" was directed by Jake Nava and filmed in South Africa in April 2002. It features the trio enjoying a sunny day at the coastline. To further promote "It's OK!", the band performed the song during several televised appearances and at the Party in the Park. In addition, the song was added to the set list of most of their following concert tours, including The Big Reunion concert series in 2013.

Background
"It's OK!" was written by Hallgeir Rustan, Mikkel Storleer Eriksen and Tor Erik Hermansen, a trio of Norwegian musicians who work under the production moniker Stargate. It is one out of two tracks they contributed to parent album Feels So Good (2002), the other being "The Last Goodbye". Recording took place at the Metropolis Studios in London and was overseen by Neil Tucker, while mixing was helmed at the StarGate Studios in Norway.

Chart performance
"It's OK!" was selected as the lead single from Atomic Kitten's second studio album Feel So Good (2002). A worldwide success, it sold over 400,000 copies in total. In the United Kingdom, the song debuted and peaked at number three on the UK Singles Chart. While it became the group's third non-consecutive top five single, it was the album's lowest-charting single. "It's OK!" was the 35th best-selling single of 2002 in the UK, selling 218,346 copies and earning a silver certification from the British Phonographic Industry (BPI). In 2012, the Official Charts Company named "It's OK!" the group's fourth best-selling single in the United Kingdom.

Elsewhere, "It's OK!" reached the forty on the majority of the charts it appeared on. It entered the top 10 in Austria, Ireland, and Switzerland and the top 20 in Germany, Spain, and Wallonia. In Denmark, it became Atomic Kitten's highest-charting single, peaking at number nine. In Flanders, "It's OK!" it peaked at number 33, while in the Netherlands, it peaked at number 21 on the Dutch Top 40. In France, the song peaked at number 37, staying in the top 40 for two weeks. In Australia, the song peaked at number 24. It was more successful in neighboring New Zealand, reaching number 16 and becoming the group's fifth top 40 hit in that country.

Music video
 The accompanying music video for "It's OK!" was directed by British filmmaker Jake Nava and filmed in South Africa in April 2002. In the clip, they portray a trio who have all split up with their boyfriends and decide to take a spontaneous holiday, doing activities such as sunbathing and paddling in the sea. The group then venture the coastline after jumping into a car, which Jenny Frost is driving; admiring the scenery and singing along to the song. During the bridge section of the song, the group attend a party in a bar at the beach, dancing with several people in the evening. During this, it occasionally switches to the group dancing on a pier, during the tranquil sunset. The video then ends with the girls sitting around a campfire, in the dead of night, with the party still in mid-conflict. Throughout the process of the video, the girls are constantly staring at different men in the bar at night.

Track listings

Notes
  denotes additional producer

Credits and personnel
Credits adapted from the liner notes of Feels So Good.

 Mikkel Storleer Eriksen – production, writing
 Jenny Frost – vocals
 Natasha Hamilton  – vocals
 Tor Erik Hermansen – production, writing

 Trond Hillestad – mixing
 Liz McClarnon – vocals
 Hallgeir Rustan – production, writing
 Neil Tucker – recording

Charts

Weekly charts

Year-end charts

Certifications

Release history

References

2002 singles
2002 songs
Atomic Kitten songs
Innocent Records singles
Music videos directed by Jake Nava
Song recordings produced by Stargate (record producers)
Songs written by Hallgeir Rustan
Songs written by Mikkel Storleer Eriksen
Songs written by Tor Erik Hermansen
Virgin Records singles